The East, Central and Southern Africa College of Physicians (ECSACOP) provides training in the region of East, Central, and Southern Africa as an independent organisation that supports postgraduate education in internal medicine. A standard internal medicine training curriculum is provided by ECSACOP, together with a qualification exam that has been internationally benchmarked. Kenya, Malawi, Rwanda, Tanzania, Uganda, Zambia, and Zimbabwe are the current seven sub-Saharan nations where ECSACOP conducts operations on a non-profit basis.

Partner organisations 
The College also has a long-standing collaboration programme with the Royal College of Physicians.

See also 
COSECSA - College of Surgeons of East, Central and Southern Africa

ECSACOG - East, Central and Southern Africa College of Obstetrics and Gynecology

References 

Health in Africa
Medical and health organisations based in Uganda
2015 establishments in Uganda